Johann Gottfried Bischoff (2 January 1871 – 6 July 1960) was a German Christian leader, Chief Apostle of the New Apostolic Church from his ordination in 1930 until 1960, time of his death.

His leadership featured several controversies. Bischoff was an ardent follower of Adolf Hitler, often expressing racist and anti-Semitic views on his writings, particularly on the official magazine of the Church, Unsere Familie. Argentine historian Aurelio Nicolella mentions that Bischoff even entertained the idea of turning his Church into the state religion of the Third Reich. On Christmas Day 1951 he delivered his infamous Botschaft (message), where he stated that Jesus Christ would fulfill his long-awaited Second Coming before his passing, claiming "the Lord will come again during my lifetime. I am the last, and there is no one after me." For a short while it would be fixed as a Church dogma. After his death, when  it became evident for the faithful that Christ would not return any time soon, a significant degree of members began to leave the Church.

Books
 Questions and Answers (Catechism)

Bibliography

German
 Peter Kuhlen: Ereignisse in der Neuapostolischen Kirche die zur Gründung der Apostolischen Gemeinde geführt haben Eigenverlag, o. J. vermutlich um 1955, o. ISBN
 Manifest über die Zustände und Tendenzen in der Neuapostolischen Gemeinde ohne , Eigenverlag / Schweiz, o. J., o. ISBN
 Herbert Schmidt: Die Wahrheit, Eigenverlag, o. J. vermutlich 1960er Jahre, o. ISBN
 Kurt Hutten: Seher – Grübler – Enthusiasten; 1982
 Karl E. Siegel: Die Botschaft des J. G. Bischoff: Eine kritische Auseinandersetzung mit einer der Endzeitbotschaften Lachesis 1994, 
 Susanne Scheibler: Johann Gottfried Bischoff Friedrich Bischoff Verlag Frankfurt, Ausgabe 1997, o. ISBN
 Helmut Obst: Apostel und Propheten der Neuzeit Vandenhoeck & Ruprecht 2000, 4. Auflage, 
 Netzwerk Apostolische Geschichte: Kirche auf dem Weg – die apostolischen Gemeinschaften im Verlauf des 20. Jahrhunderts. (mit Beitrag zur Botschaft des J.G. Bischoff von M. Koch) Bielefeld 2010, 
 Rudolf J. Stiegelmeyer: Das tragische Erbe des J.G. Bischoff: Die Botschaft wird 60, Books on Demand 2011,

Further reading
 Setbacks in Nazi Germany
 "Botschaft" by Chief Apostle Bischoff

References

Members of the New Apostolic Church
German Christian clergy
Clergy from Bavaria
1871 births
1960 deaths